Julien Serwy was a Belgian long-distance runner. He competed in the men's 5000 metres at the 1928 Summer Olympics.

References

Year of birth missing
Year of death missing
Athletes (track and field) at the 1928 Summer Olympics
Belgian male long-distance runners
Olympic athletes of Belgium
Place of birth missing